Tread softly is a composition for orchestra by the American composer Nina C. Young.  The work was commissioned by the New York Philharmonic as the first part of their "Project 19," an initiative commissioning new works by 19 female composers in honor of the centennial of the ratification of the Nineteenth Amendment to the United States Constitution. It was first performed by the New York Philharmonic under the direction of Jaap van Zweden at David Geffen Hall on February 5, 2020.

Composition
Tread softly is cast in a single movement and has a duration of roughly fourteen minutes in performance.  The work's title comes from the final line of poem "Aedh Wishes for the Cloths of Heaven" by W. B. Yeats. In the score program note, Young wrote:

Instrumentation
The work is scored for a large orchestra comprising three flutes (one doubling piccolo), three oboes (one doubling English horn), two clarinets, bass clarinet, two bassoons, contrabassoon, four horns, two trumpets, three trombones, tuba, timpani, percussion (crotales, orchestra bells, vibraphone, suspended cymbals, tam-tam, tambourine, temple blocks, snare drum, bass drum) harp, piano, and strings.

Reception
Reviewing the world premiere, Anthony Tommasini of The New York Times praised Tread softly, describing it as "a good start to the Philharmonic's ambitious and timely project."  Jay Nordlinger of The New Criterion wrote, "The piece has plenty of soft percussion, and a 'wash,' at least for a while. I'm talking about an aural sheen. From the brass section, there are interesting sounds, including shudders, mutings, and slidings. There are some fluttering, Debussyan woodwinds—and an extended violin solo, almost a cadenza. It smacks of the Gypsy, and I wrote in my notes, 'Czardas?'"  He added, "There are many musical ideas in Tread softly, and whether they cohere, I'm not sure. The work is about ten minutes long—our program booklet said so—but it sounded longer to me. Then again, many new works do (and not a few old ones, to be sure). I also had the feeling that the music was deeply personal to the composer, in ways a listener could not imagine."  George Grella of the New York Classical Review was somewhat less favorable, however, describing the work as "an acceptable and fairly predictable commission, a work with skilled notation and a rote conception, the kind of thing that makes up the bulk of new music from professional composers." He added:

References

Compositions by Nina C. Young
2020 compositions
Compositions for symphony orchestra
Music commissioned by the New York Philharmonic